The women's 100 metres hurdles event at the 1975 Pan American Games was held in Mexico City on 18 and 19 October.

Medalists

Results

Heats

Wind:Heat 1: 0.0 m/s, Heat 2: 0.0 m/s, Heat 3: 0.0 m/s

Final
Wind: -0.3 m/s

References

Athletics at the 1975 Pan American Games
1975